Gerek Lin Meinhardt (born July 27, 1990) is an American right-handed foil fencer. Meinhardt is a two-time individual NCAA champion, 12-time team Pan American champion, three-time individual Pan American champion and 2019 team world champion. A four-time Olympian, Meinhardt is a two-time team Olympic bronze medalist. Meinhardt competed in the 2008 Beijing Olympic Games, the 2012 London Olympic Games, the 2016 Rio de Janeiro Olympic Games, and the 2020 Tokyo Olympic Games.

Biography
Meinhardt is one of two children born to Kurt and Jane Meinhardt. He attended Lick-Wilmerding High School in San Francisco for two years and completed high school in a home schooling program. He attended the University of Notre Dame on a full fencing scholarship. He majored in business and finance, and was a member of the school's fencing team from 2009 to 2014. Gerek was employed by Deloitte Advisory before enrolling at the University of Kentucky College of Medicine in 2020. He married fellow American fencer Lee Kiefer in September 2019.

Introduced to the sport at age 9 through a program run by Olympic fencer Greg Massialas, Meinhardt began participating in national fencing competitions a year later. At age 16 he became the youngest men's national foil champion when he won the tournament at the 2007 U.S. Fencing National Championships.

By winning at the 2014 NCAA Fencing National Championships, he joined female fencer Lee Kiefer and swimmer Emma Reaney as part of the 2nd Notre Dame Fighting Irish trio to be named individual national champion in a single year and the 4th to be either individual national champion or national athlete of the year in a single year.

Ranked 16th in the world at the time, he participated in the 2008 Summer Olympics in Beijing as a member of the United States fencing team. He was the youngest fencer in Beijing and the youngest U.S. Olympic fencer of all time. At the 2010 World Fencing Championships in Paris, he won a bronze medal in the men's foil event, tying with Yuki Ota of Japan. After his gold medal win at the 2012 U.S National Championships, he was selected as an alternate fencer for the 2012 London Olympics U.S men's foil team. For the 2016 Rio Olympics he was selected as a member of the United States fencing team and won the bronze medal in the team foil competition. He again qualified for the United States in fencing at the 2020 Olympics in Tokyo where he won his second consecutive bronze medal in team foil.

Meinhardt is a member of the FIE Hall of Fame.

Medal record

Olympic Games

World Championship

Pan American Championship

Grand Prix

World Cup

See also
List of USFA Division I National Champions

References

External links

Statistics on Nahouw.net

1990 births
Living people
Fencers from San Francisco
American male foil fencers
Fencers at the 2008 Summer Olympics
Fencers at the 2012 Summer Olympics
Fencers at the 2016 Summer Olympics
Fencers at the 2011 Pan American Games
Notre Dame Fighting Irish fencers
American sportspeople of Taiwanese descent
Olympic bronze medalists for the United States in fencing
Medalists at the 2016 Summer Olympics
Pan American Games medalists in fencing
Pan American Games gold medalists for the United States
Pan American Games silver medalists for the United States
Fencers at the 2019 Pan American Games
World Fencing Championships medalists
Medalists at the 2011 Pan American Games
Medalists at the 2019 Pan American Games
Fencers at the 2020 Summer Olympics
Medalists at the 2020 Summer Olympics
University of Kentucky College of Medicine alumni